V Meng "Gary" Tan (born 23 September 1973) is a Singaporean backstroke, butterfly and medley swimmer. He competed in four events at the 1992 Summer Olympics.

References

External links
 

1973 births
Living people
Singaporean male backstroke swimmers
Singaporean male butterfly swimmers
Singaporean male medley swimmers
Olympic swimmers of Singapore
Swimmers at the 1992 Summer Olympics
Place of birth missing (living people)